Alexander Milov  (born 1 April 1979) is a Ukrainian artist and sculptor from Odesa. He is best known for creating Love, a large sculpture which was displayed at the 2015 Burning Man festival.

Early life 
Alexander Milov was born on 1 April 1979 in Odesa, Ukraine which was part of the USSR at the time of his birth. According to the artist's website, throughout his early life he experimented with art and with film. He began focussing on sculpting in 2000. In 2006 he began learning blacksmithing.

Career 
He is a Ukrainian sculptor, filmmaker, blacksmith, and designer. He is known for his Love sculpture which was featured at the 2015 Burning man festival in Nevada. In 2015 he garnered worldwide attention when he modified a Vladimir Lenin statue in Odesa, Ukraine. He transformed the statue into a figure of Darth Vader. In 2019 he created the sculpture Listen to the World and it was displayed at Vivid Sydney. 

In 2021 he designed a coronavirus monument which will be displayed in Dubai. The design will feature 56 human figures of adults and children without mouths. He has said that the monument will be 9 tons. The materials will be polyester resin, concrete and stainless steel. The monument also featured same sex couples.

See also 
List of Ukrainian artists

References

External links 
 AP Video: Darth Vader statue unveiled in place of Lenin

Ukrainian sculptors
Living people
1979 births
21st-century sculptors
People from Odesa